Joseph S. Benigno (born September 26, 1953) is an American sports radio personality. He was a co-host of the Joe & Evan show with Evan Roberts weekdays from 2 p.m. to 6 p.m. ET on the New York radio stations WFAN-AM and WFAN-FM. His retirement was announced on October 28, 2020. After his radio retirement, Joe began hosting Oh the Pain, a weekly podcast available on Spotify and Apple Podcast.

Biography

Early years
Benigno, who is of Italian descent, was born in Garfield, New Jersey and grew up in nearby Paramus. He graduated from Franklin College in 1975 with a degree in political science. Prior to joining WFAN, Benigno was a frequent caller to the station and was known on-air as "Joe from Saddle River."

Professional radio career
His first taste of radio experience occurred in 1994, when he guest-hosted a show on WFAN as a result of winning a contest held by the station. He then hosted a sports-talk show on a radio station in Elizabeth, New Jersey before returning to WFAN as their overnight host in 1995. He continued as overnight host until November 2004, when he was moved to middays to co-host with Sid Rosenberg after Rosenberg's previous co-host, Jody McDonald, did not have his contract renewed with the station. After Rosenberg resigned from the station on September 12, 2005, Benigno became the sole host of the midday show until January 2007, when he was paired with Evan Roberts.

Benigno also co-hosted Daily News Live on SNY.

Benigno was filling in for the vacationing Boomer and Carton in the Morning program on March 28, 2013 with his partner Roberts, when Benigno made disparaging remarks about having to get makeup done. (The program was simulcast on MSG.) Benigno said that he was annoyed about the chair time required for MSG's "11 viewers." The Benigno & Roberts show scheduled to be broadcast on Good Friday via MSG was immediately cancelled.

On April 25, 2013, Benigno faced criticism for jokingly saying he would "buy drugs for Tyrann Mathieu" if the New York Jets drafted him.

Personal life
Benigno is an avid fan of the New York Mets, New York Knicks, New York Rangers, and most notably the New York Jets. He is known for quotes such as "Oh, the pain!" (a lift from the character Dr Smith of Lost in Space), "How 'bout that?", and "What a disaster" when describing his losing teams, as well as  "Bro", "stellar", and "All The Love".

Benigno often makes light of his resemblance to professional baseball player Sal Fasano, Count Dracula, and Hollywood actor Vincent Schiavelli.

Benigno released a book in April 2010, titled "Rules for New York Sports Fans."

On July 18, 2018, a wide-ranging lawsuit was filed by former WFAN employee Lauren Lockwood against WFAN, WCBS, various WFAN executives, as well as Benigno, alleging, among other things, that "WFAN host Joe Benigno pressured her into having a threesome" and that Benigno "whispered in [Lockwood’s] ear about having ‘threesomes’ with him and his wife and prostitutes." Through his representative, Benigno denied the allegations. In response to the lawsuit, Benigno was placed on an indefinite leave of absence from the station, returning on a regular basis on September 10, 2018.

On October 28, 2020, Benigno announced that he would retire, with November 6, 2020 being his last show.  Benigno would later return to the station on a limited basis in 2022, appearing on Monday mornings during the NFL season during WFAN's mid-day show, as well as hosting a Saturday morning show with Evan Roberts.

References

External links

 Joe Benigno « CBS New York
 

1953 births
American people of Italian descent
Living people
People from Garfield, New Jersey
People from Old Tappan, New Jersey
People from Paramus, New Jersey
Paramus High School alumni
SportsNet New York
Franklin College (Indiana) alumni
American sports radio personalities